Cooksborough is a townland in County Westmeath, Ireland.

Cooksborough is one of 34 townlands of the civil parish of Rathconnell in the barony of Moyashel and Magheradernon in the Province of Leinster. 

The neighbouring townlands are: Cloghanumera, Killynan (Cooke) and Mountrobert to the north, Clonickilvant to the east, Castledown and Wood Down (barony of Farbill) to the south and Macetown to the west.

In the 1911 census of Ireland there were 9 houses and 47 inhabitants in the townland.

References

External links
Map of Cooksborough at openstreetmap.org
Cooksborough at the IreAtlas Townland Data Base
Cooksborough at Townlands.ie
Cooksborough at The Placenames Database of Ireland

Townlands of County Westmeath